Pistvakt – En vintersaga (English: Piste watch – A winter's tale) was a Swedish television series, produced by SVT subdepartment SVT Drama, and aired over SVT1 between 15 January 1998 and 30 November 2000. It is based on a play by Pistolteatern. It was followed by the film Pistvakt.

Story
The story revolves around three brother ski patrollers: Sven-Erik, Jan-Erik and Olle Marklund. Living and working in the isolated and fictitious village Svartlien, they face the horrors of solitude and dangers of the wild nature. Their father Stor-Erik, missing for decades, is always present as a symbol of perfection and the ultimate idol for the brothers.

The boys' primary tasks are weather reports and the oiling of the ski lift. They go about their job with utter determination and never let anything come between them and the completion of those jobs.

Occasionally, visitors arrive at Svartlien, with the common result that Sven-Erik has to save them from wild animals, avalanches or other dangers. Also living in Svartlien are the boys' mother Gudrun, and her secret admirer Bengt-Hans, owner of Bengt-Hans Bodega.

Cast
Lennart Jähkel as Sven-Erik Ivar Marklund
Jacob Nordenson as Jan-Erik Ivar Marklund
Tomas Norström as Olle Ivar Marklund
Pierre Lindstedt as Bengt-Hans
Barbro Oborg as Gudrun
Carl Magnus Dellow as Yngve
Margareta Stone as Eva-Lena
Sten Ljunggren as Stor-Erik

Template and style
Every episode follows quite a strict template. Starting with a voice-over describing the basic plot of the series, the camera pans from a crude model of the mountaintop near the brothers' home to their little house. During the pan, the audience appears for the first (and sometimes only) time in the episode, breaking the fourth wall.

A very common ingredient in the series is Sven-Erik having to be the rescuer of either his brothers or the guests in the village. The series relies heavily on deadpan humour and running gags.

In the end of every episode the brothers perform a dance in Bengt-Hans Bodega, often to the tune of a classic disco song. After the song, Gudrun generally stays in the bodega, talking to Bengt-Hans, a conversation often filled with innuendo. When Gudrun leaves, Bengt-Hans always exclaims "Oh, Gudrun!".

The brothers are by that time in their triple-level bunkbed, where they discuss the events of the day.

The language of the brothers is a fictitious dialect of Swedish, based on northern dialects, but with a number of neologisms added.

Impact
The series was a success and had a follow-up second series, aired in 2000, and a movie (Taglined, roughly translated, "An Albino Western from the White Desert" referring to the snow in the Swedish mountains) in 2005.

Episodes

Season 1
Lavinbjärn (English: Avalanche Bear) – 15 January 1998
Årets vackraste dag (English: The most beautiful day of the year) – 22 January 1998
Svartlien 2010 – 29 January 1998
Flytande inspektion (English: Floating inspection) – 5  February 1998
Doris är död (English: Doris is dead) – 12  February 1998
Julafton -73 (English: Christmas Eve -73) – 19 February 1998

Season 2
Väck inte den bjärv som sover (English: Don't wake up the bear-wolverine who sleeping) – 26 October 2000
Besök från Vargvallen (English: Visit from Vargvallen) – 2 November 2000
Lusekoftanovan (English: The lusekofta nova) – 9 November 2000
Samesilvre i Kinaskreve (English: Sami silver in China Crevasse) – 16 November 2000
Personalfestan (English: The staff party) – 23 November 2000
Jakten på en dräpare (English: The hunt for a killer) – 30 November 2000

References

External links

1998 Swedish television series debuts
2000 Swedish television series endings
1990s Swedish television series
2000s Swedish television series
Sveriges Television comedy shows
Swedish television sitcoms